Arboga River (Swedish: Arbogaån) is a river in Sweden. It flows from the lake Väringen, through Arboga and eventually into the lake Mälaren at Kungsör.

References

Rivers of Västmanland County